Ricci James Martin (born Ricci Crocetti, September 20, 1953 – August 3, 2016) was an American musician and singer. He was a son of Dean Martin.
He established his band, The Pack. In 1977, he released the album Beached in collaboration with The Beach Boys member Carl Wilson and toured in the United States and Canada as the band's opening act. Wilson later became his brother-in-law when Wilson married Ricci's sister, Gina Martin.

He moved to Utah in 1990 and later joined the trio Ricci, Desi & Billy; it was a latter-day version of Dino, Desi & Billy. The act had previously included his brother Dean Paul Martin, who died in a plane crash in 1987.
In 2002, Martin published That's Amore: A Son Remembers, reflecting on his relationship with his father Dean Martin.

For almost ten years of his musical career, he was a performer in the show His Son Remembers: Dean Martin’s Music and More, a tribute show to his father.

Personal life
Ricci James Martin was the son of singer Dean Martin and his second wife Jeanne Biegger and the sixth of his father's eight children. Martin was married and had three daughters: Pepper, Montana and Rio.  He died on August 3, 2016, at age 62, of an undisclosed cause. His mother died three weeks later, on August 24, 2016, in Beverly Hills, California.

In 2022, Ricci's daughter Pepper came in third place on the first season of reality television series Claim to Fame.

Bibliography

References

External links
 

1953 births
2016 deaths
American people of English descent
American people of Italian descent
People from Santa Monica, California
Musicians from Beverly Hills, California
20th-century American singers
20th-century American male singers
21st-century American singers
21st-century American male singers
Dean Martin